In mathematics, uniform integrability is an important concept in real analysis, functional analysis and measure theory, and plays a vital role in the theory of martingales.

Measure-theoretic definition
Several textbooks on real analysis and measure theory use the following definition:

Definition A:  Let  be a positive measure space. A set  is called uniformly integrable if , and to each  there corresponds a  such that

 

whenever  and 

Definition A is rather restrictive for infinite measure spaces. A slightly more general definition of uniform integrability that works well in general measures spaces was introduced by G. A. Hunt.

Definition H: Let  be a positive measure space. A set  is  called uniformly integrable if and only if

where .

For finite measure spaces the following result follows from Definition H:

Theorem 1: If  is a (positive) finite  measure space, then  a set  is  uniformly integrable if and only if

Many textbooks in probability present Theorem 1 as the definition of uniform integrability in Probability spaces. When the space  is -finite, Definition H yields the following equivalency:

Theorem 2: Let  be a -finite measure space, and  be such that  almost surely. A set  is uniformly integrable if and only if , and for any , there exits  such that

whenever .

In particular,  the equivalence of Definitions A and H for finite measures follows immediately from Theorem 2; for this case, the statement in Definition A is obtained by taking  in Theorem 2.

Probability definition
In the theory of probability, Definition A or the statement of Theorem 1 are often presented  as definitions of uniform integrability using the notation expectation of random variables., that is,

1. A class  of random variables is called uniformly integrable if:

or alternatively

2.  A class  of random variables is called uniformly integrable (UI) if for every  there exists  such that , where  is the indicator function  .

Tightness and uniform integrability

One consequence of uniformly integrability of a class   of random variables is that family of  laws or distributions  is tight. That is, for each , there exists  such that

for all .

This however, does not mean that the family of measures  is tight.

There is another  notion of uniformity, slightly different than uniform integrability,  which also has many applications in  Probability and measure theory, and which does not require random variables to have a finite integral

Definition: Suppose  is a probability space. A classed  of random variables is   uniformly absolutely continuous with respect to  if for any , there is  such that

whenever .

The term "uniform absolute continuity" is not standard, but is used by some other authors.

Related corollaries
The following results apply to the probabilistic definition.
 Definition 1 could be rewritten by taking the limits as 
 A non-UI sequence. Let , and define  Clearly , and indeed  for all n. However,  and comparing with definition 1, it is seen that the sequence is not uniformly integrable.
   
 By using Definition 2 in the above example, it can be seen that the first clause is satisfied as  norm of all s are 1 i.e., bounded.
 If any sequence of random variables  is dominated by an integrable, non-negative : that is, for all ω and n,  then the class  of random variables  is uniformly integrable.

Relevant theorems

 Dunford–Pettis theoremA class of random variables  is uniformly integrable if and only if it is relatively compact for the weak topology .
de la Vallée-Poussin theoremThe family  is uniformly integrable if and only if there exists a non-negative increasing convex function  such that

Relation to convergence of random variables

In probability terms, a sequence of random variables converging in probability also converge in the mean if and only if they are uniformly integrable. This is a generalization of Lebesgue's dominated convergence theorem, see Vitali convergence theorem.

Citations

References
 
 Diestel, J. and Uhl, J. (1977). Vector measures, Mathematical Surveys 15, American Mathematical Society, Providence, RI 

Martingale theory